Rudge is a settlement and civil parish about 6 miles east of Bridgnorth, in the Shropshire district, in the ceremonial county of Shropshire, England. In 2001 the parish had a population of 98. The parish touches those of Claverley and Worfield within Shropshire and  Pattingham and Patshull and Trysull and Seisdon in Staffordshire. Rudge shares a parish council with Worfield.

Landmarks 
There are 4 listed buildings in Rudge.

History 
The name "Rudge" means 'ridge'. 

Rudge was recorded in the Domesday Book as Rigge. Rudge was formerly a township in the parish of Pattingham until in 1866 Rudge became a civil parish in its own right. On 1 April 1967 17 acres was transferred to Claverley parish.

References

External links 
 Parish council

Villages in Shropshire
Civil parishes in Shropshire